Chad Randall Barrett (born April 30, 1985) is an American former professional soccer player who played as a forward.

Career

College
Born in San Diego, Barrett played two seasons of college soccer at UCLA and led the team in assists his second year. He chose to forgo the rest of his college career, signing a Generation adidas contract with MLS.  He attended Southridge HS and played Club Soccer for Westside Metros in Beaverton Oregon.

Professional
Chicago Fire drafted Barrett with the third overall pick of the 2005 MLS SuperDraft, and he quickly established himself as a starter for the Fire during the 2007 season, scoring seven goals. He scored a key goal in the Fire's win at D.C. United in the first round of the playoffs.

Barrett is known for his workman-like play. In his three seasons with Chicago, he led the team in goals two years, and was second the other. Not known for a great first touch, his industrious play resulted in eighteen league goals in his time in Chicago where the often more heralded Calen Carr failed to impress.

With the Chicago Fire, Barrett won the 2006 Lamar Hunt U.S. Open Cup.

On April 12, 2008, Barrett led Chicago Fire over San Jose Earthquakes 1–0 in front of 20,038 fans at the Earthquakes home opener at McAfee Coliseum. Barrett tallied the game-winning goal in the ninth minute, while Fire goalkeeper Jon Busch recorded eight saves in his second shutout of the season.

He, along with a first-round pick in the 2009 MLS SuperDraft and allocation money, was traded to Toronto FC on July 25, 2008, in exchange for the rights to Brian McBride. Barrett signed a 4-year contract extension with Toronto FC on September 1, 2008.

On April 28, 2010, Barrett scored his first goal of the 2010 season, the second goal in a 2–0 win over Montreal Impact during the opening game of the 2010 Canadian Championship On May 8, 2010, Barrett added his first league goals of the season, scoring a pair in Toronto's 4–1 win over his former team Chicago Fire.

In the 2010–11 CONCACAF Champions League Preliminary Round tie against C.D. Motagua, Barrett scored two goals (one in each leg), helping Toronto F.C. to a 3–2 aggregate win.

Barrett was traded to LA Galaxy on January 13, 2011 in exchange for future considerations. On October 2, 2011, Barrett scored his 40th career goal in a 2–1 over Real Salt Lake. This goal placed Barrett in the top 50 MLS scorers of all-time.

After a brief trial, Barrett was loaned to Norwegian club Vålerenga on July 30, 2012.

Los Angeles declined Barrett's contract option for 2013 and he elected to enter the 2012 MLS Re-Entry Draft. On December 14, 2012, Barrett was selected in stage two of the draft by New England Revolution with the number 4 overall pick.  He later officially signed a deal with the club on February 11, 2013.

On December 18, 2013, Barrett was picked up in the second stage of the 2013 MLS Re-Entry Draft by Seattle Sounders FC.  On March 8, 2014, in the Sounders season opener against Sporting KC, Barrett scored the game-winning goal in stoppage time with the game ending 1–0.

On December 28, 2015, Barrett signed with San Jose Earthquakes as a free agent.

On January 23, 2017, Barrett signed with Real Salt Lake as a free agent. His option was declined at the end of the 2017 season. He officially announced his retirement as an active player on his Instagram account on September 25, 2018.

International
Barrett has played for various youth United States national teams. He was a key player on the Under-20 team at the 2005 World Youth Championship and was named to the U-23 men's national team for 2008 Olympic qualifying.

He made his debut for the United States men's national soccer team on June 22, 2008, coming on as a second-half substitute in a World Cup qualifier against Barbados.

Media
Whilst recovering from injury Barrett and teammate David Horst would do live radio shows entitled 'the horse, the bear and the lion' which would be streamed on the RSL Facebook page.

He previews and commentates on MLS matches for ESPN700 Sports in Salt Lake.

Honors

Chicago Fire
U.S. Open Cup (1): 2006

Toronto FC
Canadian Championship (2): 2009, 2010

LA Galaxy
MLS Cup (1): 2011
Supporters' Shield (1): 2011
Western Conference (Playoffs) (1): 2011

Seattle Sounders FC
Supporters' Shield (1): 2014
U.S. Open Cup (1): 2014

References

External links
 
 

1985 births
Living people
American expatriate soccer players
American expatriate sportspeople in Canada
American expatriate sportspeople in Norway

American soccer players
Association football forwards
Chicago Fire FC draft picks
Chicago Fire FC players
Expatriate soccer players in Canada
Expatriate footballers in Norway
LA Galaxy players
Major League Soccer players
New England Revolution players
Parade High School All-Americans (boys' soccer)
Real Salt Lake players
San Jose Earthquakes players
Seattle Sounders FC players
Soccer players from San Diego
Southridge High School (Beaverton, Oregon) alumni
Eliteserien players
Toronto FC players
UCLA Bruins men's soccer players
United States men's international soccer players
United States men's under-20 international soccer players
United States men's under-23 international soccer players
United States men's youth international soccer players
Vålerenga Fotball players